Mirabilis coccinea, the scarlet four o'clock, is a spring wildflower native to the southwestern United States and northwestern Mexico. The plant grows to two feet with deep red flowers which open at night. The plant can be found on washes, plains, and rocky slopes.

References

Mojave Desert Wildflowers, Jon Mark Stewart, 1998, pg. 116

External links
Jepson Manual Treatment
Photo gallery

Night-blooming plants
coccinea
North American desert flora